Big Pines is an unincorporated community in Los Angeles County, California, United States. It is in the Angeles National Forest, San Gabriel Mountains.

Geography
The community is located in the Swarthout Valley, which was first settled in 1851. It is bordered on the east by the San Bernardino County line and the town of Wrightwood.

It is the highest elevation settlement located on the San Andreas Fault.

To the west of Big Pines is Jackson Lake, a sag pond located on the San Andreas Fault. The lake is home to many recreational activities.

Recreation
Big Pines began as a year-round recreation area built by Los Angeles County in 1924.  It is a popular ski area close to Los Angeles, as it has a history of significant snowfall, even as late as May.

The Mountain High Ski Resort and the Table Mountain Observatory are located in Big Pines.

See also
Big Pines Highway
Mountain High
Wrightwood
Carnival Boat a logging movie filmed on location in 1932

References

Unincorporated communities in Los Angeles County, California
San Gabriel Mountains
Angeles National Forest
Hill and mountain resorts
Ski areas and resorts in California
Wrightwood, California
Tourist attractions in Los Angeles County, California
Populated places established in 1924
1924 establishments in California
Unincorporated communities in California